The following is a list of notable deaths in November 1966.

Entries for each day are listed alphabetically by surname. A typical entry lists information in the following sequence:
 Name, age, country of citizenship at birth, subsequent country of citizenship (if applicable), reason for notability, cause of death (if known), and reference.

November 1966

1 
 Charles Catterall, South African boxer, silver medal at the 1936 Summer Olympics (b. 1914)
 Eva Garza, American singer and actress (b. 1917)
 Abraham Jacob Hollandersky, Russian-born American boxer (b. 1887)
 Teotan Lebedev, Russian sports shooter, competed at the 1912 Summer Olympics (b. 1871)
 Sara W. Mahan, American politician, Secretary of State of Kentucky (b. 1870)
 Liam Ó Buachalla, Irish historian

2 
 Sadao Araki, Japanese Army general during World War II (b. 1877)
 Domenico Cavagnari, Italian admiral, chief of staff of the Italian Royal Navy (b. 1876)
 Peter Debye, Dutch-American chemist working in Nazi Germany, Nobel Prize laureate (b. 1884)
 Mississippi John Hurt, American singer and guitarist (b. 1893)
 Culver Hastedt, American sprinter, gold medal at the 1904 Summer Olympics (b. 1884)
 Gen. Ben Lear, Canadian-born American equestrian (bronze medal during the 1912 Summer Olympics), and general during World War II (b. 1879)

3 
 Byron Barr, American actor (b. 1917)
 Fritz Baumgarten, German book illustrator (b. 1883)
 Streeter Blair, American painter (b. 1888)
 John T. Cahill, American lawyer (b. 1903)

4 
 Air Chief Marshal Sir Arthur Barratt, British RAF officer, (b. 1891)
 Gen. Dietrich von Choltitz, Nazi German military governor of Paris in World War II (b. 1894)

5 
1839293929394 jfjfjfs many deaths so many that everyone died aaa!!!

6 
 Germaine Dermoz, French actress (b. 1888)
 Ernst Fabri, Austrian-born Soviet journalist (b. 1891)
 Hugh Fraser, 1st Baron Fraser of Allander, British nobleman and retailer (b. 1903)

7 
 Rube Bressler, American baseball player (b. 1894)
 George Way Harley, American Methodist missionary (b.1894)
 Gen. Kurt Jahn, German general during World War II (b. 1892)
 Murray Lincoln, American businessman (b. 1892)

8 
 Frank B. Anderson, American college football, and baseball coach as well as athletic director (b. 1882) 
 Shorty Baker, American jazz trumpeter (b. 1914)
 André Bloc, French sculptor (b. 1896)
 Sir Philip Colfox, 1st Baronet, English soldier and politician, MP (b. 1888)
 Hans Finohr, German actor (b. 1891)
 Ronald Holyoake, English cricketer (b. 1894)
 Norm Jordan, Australian rules footballer (b. 1888)
 Henry B. Krajewski, American politician (b. 1912)
 Bernhard Zondek German-born Israeli gynecologist, developer of first reliable pregnancy test (b. 1891)

9 
 Richard Benz, German historian and writer (b. 1884)
 Brady P. Gentry, American politician, U.S. Representative from Texas (b. 1896)
 Peter Hillwood, British test pilot (b. 1920)
 Andy Iona, American musician (b. 1902)
 James V. Kern, American singer, songwriter, and actor (b. 1909)
 Jisaburō Ozawa, Japanese admiral (b. 1886)

10 
 Sir Henry Dalton, English police executive (b. 1891) 
 Eddie Erdelatz, American football player and coach (b. 1913)
 Luther Magby, American singer (b. 1896)

11 
 Carl Jonsson, Swedish Olympian, gold medalist in the tug of war competition at the 1912 Summer Olympics (b. 1885)
 Helen Hull Law, American academic (b. 1890)

12 
 Zeenat Begum, Pakistani singer
 Donald L. Branson, American racecar driver (b. 1920)
 Chic Calderwood, Scottish boxer (b. 1937)
 Bob Gardner, Australian politician (b. 1890)
 Shakeb Jalali, Pakistani poet (b. 1934)
 Mike Loan, American baseball player (b. 1894)

13 
 Dick Atkins, American race car driver (b. 1936)
 Mario Chamlee, American opera singer (b. 1892)
 Joseph Xavier Grant, American Army officer, recipient of the Medal of Honor (b. 1940)
 Bamm David Hogarth, Canadian politician and judge, member of the Legislative Assembly of Saskatchewan (b. 1887)
 Apache, Viet Cong sniper (b. 1936)

14 
 Peter Baker, British politician, last MP expelled from the House of Commons (b. 1921)
 Nikolai Ignatov, Russian-born Soviet politician, Chairman of the Presidium of the Supreme Soviet of the Russian Soviet Federative Socialist Republic (b. 1901)
 Zengo Yoshida, Japanese admiral (b. 1885)

15 
 Billy Dougall, Scottish football player and manager (b. 1895)
 Aymar Embury II, American architect (b. 1880)
 George Gund II, American businessman (b. 1888)
 William Haade, American actor (b. 1903)
 Herbert Kessler, Swiss ice hockey player, competed at the 1936 Winter Olympics (b. 1912)

16 
 Eric Arbuthnot, South African cricketer (b. 1888)
 Gord Hannigan, Canadian-American ice hockey player (b. 1929)
 Cluny Macpherson, Newfoundland and Canadian physician (b. 1879)

17 
 Wally Chalmers, Australian rules footballer (b. 1890)
 Émile Colinus, French artist (b. 1884)
 James "Jabby" Jabara, American aviator, the first American jet fighter ace (b. 1923)
 Wal Hannington, British Communist leader (b. 1896)
 Olaf Knudsen, Norwegian wrestler, competed at the 1936 Summer Olympics (b. 1911)

18 
 Mike Connolly, American reporter and columnist (b. 1914)
 Vincenzo Di Francesca, Italian Latter-Day Saint leader (b. 1888)
 Kawai Kanjirō, Japanese potter (b. 1890)

19 
 Mendel Balberyszski, Lithuanian & Polish politician and author on the Holocaust in Lithuania (b. 1894)
 Ted Belcher, United States Army soldier, recipient of the Medal of Honor (b. 1924)
 Terezie Brzková, Czechoslovak film actress (b. 1875)
 Francis Craig, American songwriter and bandleader (b. 1900)
 Émmanuel d'Anjou, Canadian politician, member of the House of Commons of Canada (b. 1884)
 Hens Dekkers, Dutch boxer, competed at the 1936 Olympics (b. 1915)
 Margarete Haagen, German actress (b. 1889)
 Arthur Haynes, English comedian (b. 1914)
 Marcel Lecomte, Belgian writer (b. 1900)

20

21 
 Władysław Bortnowski, Polish general in World War II (b. 1891)
 Sir Thomas MacFarland Cherry, Australian mathematician (b. 1898)
 Jesse Whitfield Covington, United States Navy recipient of the Medal of Honor (b. 1889)
 Josef Haszpra, Czechoslovak artist (b. 1882)
 Pat Hogan, American actor (b. 1920)
 David L. Lawrence, American politician, Governor of Pennsylvania (b. 1889)

22 
 James E. Berry, American politician, four-term Lieutenant Governor of Oklahoma (b. 1881)
 Moises Frumencio da Costa Gomez, first Prime Minister of the Netherlands Antilles (b. 1907)
 Émile Drain, French actor (b. 1890)

23 
 Alvin Langdon Coburn, American photographer (b. 1882)
 Adolph Knopf, American geologist (b. 1882)
 Seán T. O'Kelly, second President of Ireland (b. 1882)

24 
 Ramón Amaya Amador, Honduran author (b. 1916)
 Pat Cahill, Australian rules footballer (b. 1919)
 Enrique Conill, Cuban sailor, competed at the 1924 Olympics (b. 1878)
 Tom Gulley, American baseball player (b. 1899)
 Kanken Tōyama, Japanese karate master (b. 1888)
 Li Shu Fan, Hong Kong doctor (b. 1887)

25 
 Fernande Albany, French actress (b. 1889)
 Norval Baptie, Canadian speed skater, former world record holder (b. 1879)
 Jacobus Cornelis Wyand Cossaar, Dutch painter (b. 1874).
 István Donogán, Hungarian discus thrower, competed in the Summer Olympic Games in 1928 and 1932 (b. 1897).
 Ralph Gerganoff, Bulgarian-born American architect (b. 1887)
 Sir William Reginald Halliday, English historian and academic (b. 1886)
 Thomas L. Holling, American politician, mayor of Buffalo, New York (b. 1889)
 Hans Reidar Holtermann, Norwegian army officer (b. 1895)
 Richard Kräusel, German botanist (b. 1890)
 George Lawson, Australian politician, Minister of Transport (b. 1880)

26 
 Harold Burrage, American musician (b. 1931)
 Oliver Morton Dickerson, American historian, author, and educator (b. 1875)
 Hamastegh, Ottoman-born American poet and writer (b. 1895)
 Siegfried Kracauer, German-born American writer (b. 1889)

27 
 Wenzel Jaksch, Bohemian-born German politician, member of Czechoslovak parliament and of German Bundestag (b. 1896)

28 
 Billy Engle, Austrian-born American actor (b. 1889)
 Vittorio Giannini, American composer (b. 1903)
 José Isbert, Spanish actor (b. 1886)
 Friedrich Karrenberg, German social ethicist (b. 1904)

29 
 Faras Hamdan, Israeli politician, member of the Knesset (b. 1910)
 Oluf Gabriel Lund, Norwegian military officer (b. 1873)

30 
 Ippolito Ippoliti, Italian footballer (b. 1921)

References

1966-11
November 1966 events